Patrícia Carlos de Andrade is a Brazilian economist, daughter of the journalist Evandro Carlos de Andrade (managing editor of O Globo from 1971 to 1995 and Director of TV Globo's News Center between 1995 and 2001). She was also married to economist Beny Parnes, with whom she had three children. In March 2005, she founded the Institute of National Reality Studies ("Instituto de Estudos da Realidade Nacional" - IERN), which became the Instituto Millenium in April 2006.

Academic life 
Carlos de Andrade has an M.A. in economics (1987) from Pontifícia Universidade Católica do Rio de Janeiro (PUC-RJ), when she defended a thesis about The behavior of aggregate investment in Brazil – 1960/1985 ("O comportamento do investimento agregado no Brasil – 1960/1985"). The panel was composed by Dionisio Dias Carneiro, Edmar Lisboa Bacha and Rogério Ladeira Furquim Werneck, with Dionisio Dias Carneiro as advisor. The same year, she enrolled for a doctoral program at the University of Pennsylvania, which does not seem to be completed.

In 2011, she earned a Master of Applied Positive Psychology (MAPP) from the College of Liberal and Professional Studies (University of Pennsylvania's non-traditional education division), being oriented by Martin Seligman. In the same year, she was one of the organizers of the 1st Brazilian Conference of Positive Psychology, held between 20 and 21 October in the city of Rio de Janeiro.

Professional life 
Carlos de Andrade reports to have worked to the banks Icatu and JPMorgan, in positions of "economics and political analysis." Apparently, she has ceased to work as an economist, because her registration in the professional association (CORECON-RJ) was canceled on June 29, 2006 under this claim.

Instituto Millenium 
Founded by Carlos de Andrade, the Instituto Millennium is an advocacy think tank for spreading the New Right ideas. In a 2005 article published in O Estado de S. Paulo, she sets out the role of a think tank:

To make the venture possible, it will be essential the active participation of the business community (there's no left-wing think tanks, as reminds us Denise Barbosa Gros):

The Institute avoids linking its image to the old Brazilian right-wing (associated with the repression supported by the military dictatorship), but Carlos de Andrade herself, before the presidential election of 2002 (in which Lula da Silva was elected), signed an online manifesto sponsored by the conservative journalist Olavo de Carvalho, which denounces the "dominant leftist bias in the national mainstream media", the "informal dictatorship implanted in the media to the control of consciences" and the "establishment of the absolute reign of organized lying." All this, it is worth remembering, still under the neoliberal government of President Fernando Henrique Cardoso and just over a year after the death of Evandro Carlos de Andrade, who led with an iron hand the journalism of Globo Organizations for almost three decades (1971–2001).

In 2009, in an article written for the Instituto Millenium, in which is claimed that "liberals are cornered" after "more than six years of Lulism," Carlos de Andrade took up that vision:

Publications

References

External links 
 Não sinto culpa 
 Martin Seligman: "Perseguir só a felicidade é enganoso" 

Brazilian chief executives
Brazilian columnists
Brazilian economists
Brazilian women economists
Businesspeople from Rio de Janeiro (city)
University of Pennsylvania alumni
Women chief executives
Living people
Pontifical Catholic University of Rio de Janeiro alumni
Brazilian women columnists
Year of birth missing (living people)